The 2016–17 West Virginia Mountaineers women's basketball team will represent West Virginia University during the 2016–17 NCAA Division I women's basketball season. The Mountaineers are coached by sixteenth year head coach Mike Carey and play their home games at WVU Coliseum and are members of the Big 12 Conference. The team finished sixth in the regular season but won the 2017 Big 12 Tournament. They finished with a record of 24–11, 8–10 in Big 12 play to finish in sixth place. They received an automatic bid to the NCAA women's tournament where they defeated Elon in the first round before losing to Maryland in the second round.

Roster

Schedule

|-
!colspan=12 style="background:#EEB211; color:#00457C;"| Exhibition

|-
!colspan=12 style="background:#EEB211; color:#00457C;"| Non-Conference Games

|-
!colspan=9 style="background:#EEB211; color:#00457C;"| Conference Games

|-
!colspan=9 style="background:#EEB211; color:#00457C;" | Big 12 Women's Tournament

|-
!colspan=9 style="background:#EEB211; color:#00457C;" | NCAA Women's Tournament

Rankings
2016–17 NCAA Division I women's basketball rankings

See also
 2016–17 West Virginia Mountaineers men's basketball team

References

West Virginia Mountaineers women's basketball
West Virginia
West Virginia Mountaineers women's b
West Virginia Mountaineers women's b
West Virginia